Robert George Denton (July 24, 1934 – July 8, 2014) was an American football defensive end and tackle. He played for five seasons for two different teams: the Cleveland Browns and Minnesota Vikings. He played college football at University of the Pacific.

References

1934 births
2014 deaths
American football defensive ends
American football tackles
Pacific Tigers football players
Cleveland Browns players
Minnesota Vikings players
Players of American football from California
Sportspeople from Fresno, California